Girocului, also known as Martirilor, is a district in southern Timișoara. It was built between 1970 and 1985, as a consequence of the urban systematization carried out by the Communist Party, which aimed at increasing the population of Timișoara. Its name comes from the village (Giroc) to which the road that crosses it is heading. In fact, as a result of the urban development over the past two decades, Giroc has virtually become a suburb of Timișoara.

Transport 
Public transport consists of permanent connections with the city center (lines 15, E2 and E3) and other neighboring districts (lines 7 and 9).

References 

Districts of Timișoara